The Telemedicine Act 1997, is a Malaysian law enacted to provide for the regulation and control of the practice of telemedicine and for matters connected therewith.

Structure
The Telemedicine Act 1997, in its current form (30 June 1997), consists of 6 sections and no schedule (including no amendment), without separate Part.
Section 1: Short title and commencement
Section 2: Interpretation
Section 3: Persons who may practise telemedicine
Section 4: Certificate to practise telemedicine
Section 5: Patient's consent
Section 6: Regulations

References

External links
 Telemedicine Act 1997 

1997 in Malaysian law
Malaysian federal legislation